The Church of Notre-Dame, Versailles, is a Roman Catholic parish church in Versailles, Yvelines, France, in the Rue de la Paroisse.

History 

The church was built at the command of Louis XIV by Jules Hardouin-Mansart in the Baroque (French Classicism) (see: 17th-century French art ) architectural style and was consecrated on 30 October 1686. The parish of Notre-Dame included the Palace of Versailles and thus registered the baptisms, marriages and burials of the French royal family.

In 1791 it was declared a cathedral but converted to a Temple of Reason in 1793. After the Revolution the bishop of Versailles chose the Church of Saint-Louis as his seat instead (the present Versailles Cathedral).

Between 1858 and 1873, a new chapel was added by the architect Le Poittevin, who also built the market-halls of the Marché Notre-Dame.

The church contains sculptures by Pierre Mazzeline and Noël Jouvenet.

The church has been classed as a monument historique since 4 August 2005.

Cemetery

The Cemetery of Notre-Dame was established by the church and parish of Notre-Dame in 1777 and covers three hectares. Besides quantities of burials of aristocrats, members of religious orders and people of artistic or historic interest, there is also an enclosed section for soldiers of the Prussian army who fell during the Franco-Prussian War of 1870.

Notes and references

Sources and external links
 Church of Notre-Dame, Versailles: official website 

17th-century Roman Catholic church buildings in France
Roman Catholic churches in Versailles
Versailles